William A. Ringrose (13 June 1930 – 30 April 2020) was an Irish equestrian. He competed for Ireland at the 1956 Summer Olympics and the 1960 Summer Olympics. He was educated at Synge Street CBS and University College, Dublin.

References

External links
 

1930 births
2020 deaths
Irish male equestrians
Olympic equestrians of Ireland
Equestrians at the 1956 Summer Olympics
Equestrians at the 1960 Summer Olympics
Sportspeople from County Limerick